Hapoel Netanya is a handball team from the city of Netanya, Israel. The team's colors are black and white, and it hosts its home games in Ben Gurion hall in the north side of the city.

The team was founded in the early 1980s and was a regular member of the first division until the late 1990s when the team collapsed.

In 2005 former player Uri Rafael decided to revive the team, and in the 2007-08 season the team won the third division and are now playing the second division in hope to return to the top division.

Titles
3rd Division Champions:
2007-08

References

External links
Official website

Israeli handball clubs
Sport in Netanya
Hapoel
Sports clubs established in the 1980s
1980s establishments in Israel